Andariyeh (also Romanized as Andarīyeh, Ondarīyeh, and Undarīyeh) is a village in Doboluk Rural District, Arjomand District, Firuzkuh County, Tehran Province, Iran. At the 2006 census, its population was 443, in 129 families.

References 

Populated places in Firuzkuh County